San Isabel is an unincorporated community in Custer County, Colorado, United States. The town is located on the north side of Lake Isabel and alongside  Colorado State Highway 165. Businesses in town cater to visitors to the adjacent Lake Isabel Recreation Area.

Geography
San Isabel is located at  (37.9875068 -105.0544361). It is in Colorado's Wet Mountains and is surrounded by the San Isabel National Forest.

References

Unincorporated communities in Custer County, Colorado
Unincorporated communities in Colorado